Lewis Brisbois Bisgaard & Smith LLP (commonly referred to as Lewis Brisbois) is a U.S. law firm headquartered in Los Angeles, California. Founded in 1979, the firm is a national, general practice law firm with 1,650 attorneys. The firm operates offices in 52 cities and 29 states and Washington, DC. According to Portfolio Media Inc., the firm was ranked the 9th largest in the United States based on number of attorneys, and for 2017 reported $470 million in revenues to the American Lawyer, AmLaw survey. While the firm's roots are in the area of insurance defense litigation, it has increasingly expanded into corporate and transactional areas and now represents clients in a wide range of legal services.

References

Law firms based in California